Ålandic Democracy is a national-conservative political party in Åland.

History
The party first ran in the 2015 election, receiving 3.6% of the popular vote and winning one seat in Parliament. In the 2019 election, the party received 3% of the popular vote and retained its only seat. The current party leader is Stephan Toivonen.

References

Political parties in Åland
Anti-immigration politics in Europe
National conservative parties
Conservative parties in Finland
Nationalist parties in Finland